Jennifer Simpson is a lawn bowls international player from New Zealand, who represented New Zealand at two Commonwealth Games.

Bowls career
Simpson played in the team that won the silver medal in the triples event with Pearl Dymond and Joyce Osborne at the 1982 Commonwealth Games. Four years later she represented New Zealand again at the Lawn bowls at the 1986 Commonwealth Games.

She won a silver medal at the Asia Pacific Bowls Championships in 1987.

Personal life
Her daughter Debbie White won the New Zealand national championship in 2019.

References

External links 
 

Living people
Year of birth missing (living people)
New Zealand female bowls players
Commonwealth Games silver medallists for New Zealand
Bowls players at the 1982 Commonwealth Games
Bowls players at the 1986 Commonwealth Games
Commonwealth Games medallists in lawn bowls
Medallists at the 1982 Commonwealth Games